In mathematical physics, Kundt spacetimes are Lorentzian manifolds admitting a geodesic null congruence with vanishing optical scalars (expansion, twist and shear).  A well known member of Kundt class is   pp-wave.  Ricci-flat  Kundt spacetimes in arbitrary dimension are algebraically special.  In four dimensions Ricci-flat  Kundt metrics of Petrov type III and N are completely known.  All VSI spacetimes belong to a subset of the Kundt spacetimes.

References

Lorentzian manifolds